Arne Morten Granlien (born 6 April 1955) is a Norwegian skier. He competed in the Nordic combined event at the 1980 Winter Olympics.

References

External links
 

1955 births
Living people
Norwegian male Nordic combined skiers
Olympic Nordic combined skiers of Norway
Nordic combined skiers at the 1980 Winter Olympics
Sportspeople from Lillehammer
20th-century Norwegian people